The Speech House was the administrative building of the Forest of Dean in Gloucestershire, England, lying at the centre of the forest on the road from Coleford to Cinderford.

The building was originally constructed as a hunting lodge for Charles II and the Speech House was authorised by the Act of 1668 as part of a reorganisation of the open land in the area, and its construction was finished in 1682.  It hosted the "Court of the Speech", a sort of parliament for the Verderers and Free Miners managing the forest, game, and mineral resources of the area. It was severely damaged in the Revolution of 1688, but repaired soon thereafter. Around 1840 it began to be used as an inn, and by the late 19th century it was functioning as a hotel, which  it continues to do.

To the southeast of Speech House is a small lake, Speech House Lake.

Speech House pudding was a pudding traditionally served in the verderers' court room.

Notes

References
 from  series Buildings of England orig. ed by N. Pevsner

External links
 Speech House Hotel website

Buildings and structures completed in 1682
Hotels in Gloucestershire
Houses in Gloucestershire
Forest of Dean
1682 establishments in England